George Henry "Frank" Hamilton (30 April 1863 – 7 August 1901) was a South African international rugby union player.

Biography
Born in Cape Town, he first played provincial rugby for Eastern Province. He made his only Test appearance for South Africa during Great Britain's 1891 tour. He played as a forward in the 1st Test of the series, a 4–0 loss at St George's Park. Hamilton died in 1901, in Vanrhynsdorp, at the age of 38.

Test history

See also
List of South Africa national rugby union players – Springbok no. 15

References

South African rugby union players
South Africa international rugby union players
Rugby union forwards
1863 births
1901 deaths
Rugby union players from Cape Town
Eastern Province Elephants players